Hawaiian Express may refer to:
Pineapple Express, a meteorological phenomenon
The Hawaii Express, a defunct airline